Marco Romano (born 14 October 1963) is an Italian lightweight rower. He won a gold medal at the 1982 World Rowing Championships in Lucerne with the lightweight men's four.

References

1963 births
Living people
Italian male rowers
World Rowing Championships medalists for Italy
Olympic rowers of Italy
Rowers at the 1984 Summer Olympics